Dopiaza (meaning  "two onions", is the name of two separate dishes, one in the Greater Iran region and one in South Asia. It refers to a family of recipes, typically meat-based, that contain onions as a major ingredient. There are two alternative etymological explanations for its name.

 Onions are added at two stages of cooking: chopped or ground in the marinade/gravy, and as a garnish/topping, either pickled or crisply fried. 
 The recipe uses onions and meat in a 2:1 ratio.

The dish usually contains a meat, usually beef, chicken, lamb, mutton, or shrimp; however, it can also be prepared in a vegetarian style, e.g., with okra.

History
This dish originated in Khorasan (present-day Iran and Afghanistan). It was introduced to South Asia by the Mughals (1526-1857) and has spread to countries with a South Asian diaspora. Regional variants have evolved in locales such as Hyderabad, India and several regions of Pakistan.

According to an alternative Mughal legend, the dish was created when Mullah Do-Piyaza—a courtier of Mughal Emperor Akbar— accidentally added a large quantity of onions to a dish. This the legend is considered to be fictitious, as no Mughal-era records mention any courtier by this name, and humorous anecdotes about his life and jokes were published only in the late 19th century.

Iranian dopiaza  
Dopiazeh  is a traditional dish from Shiraz and it can be made with cubed or ground lamb/beef, chicken, shrimp, potatoes, and a copious amount of sliced onions. Aloo in standard Persian means plum and it is also a term used in Shirazi Persian to mean potatoes.

Ingredients
As many other Hyderabadi dishes, the addition of a sour agent is a key part of dopiaza. Most often, raw mangoes are used; however, lemon juice or cranberries can be used as well. Basic ingredients for dopiaza are chicken or other meats, onions, ginger and garlic paste, whole hot spices (black cardamoms, cloves and peppercorns), salt and chili powder.

Iranian Dopiaza may be prepared using potatoes, onion, turmeric powder, tomato paste, dried fenugreek leaves, and spices.

See also
 Kairi ka Do Pyaza
 List of onion dishes
 Mullah Do Piaza

Notes

References

External links

Indian curries
Hyderabadi cuisine
Telangana cuisine
Pakistani curries
Muhajir cuisine
Iranian cuisine
Onion-based foods